Roger Freeman (9 October 1951 – 12 July 2003) was the SCCA ProRally Subaru factory team co-driver for Mark Lovell. He was killed along with Lovell when his rally car left the road and struck a tree shortly after the start of the first stage of the Oregon Trail Rally.

External links
 Memorial page
 Biography on RallyBase

1951 births
2003 deaths
Racing drivers who died while racing
English rally drivers
British rally co-drivers
Sports deaths in Oregon